Charles D. Hamel (c. 1882 – June 5, 1970) was a judge of the United States Board of Tax Appeals (later the United States Tax Court) from 1924 to 1925.

An attorney from Grafton, North Dakota, Hamel was clerk to the United States Senate Committee on Agriculture and Forestry in 1900 and 1907. From April 1909 to October 1915, he was employed in legal work in the United States Department of the Interior, and in October 1915 was transferred to the United States Department of Justice. In October 1917, he was appointed special assistant to the Attorney-General, serving in that capacity until December 31, 1921. In February 1922, he entered the office of the Solicitor, United States Bureau of Internal Revenue. For several months beginning in November 1923, he was chairman of the special committee on appeals and review, and thereafter became the first chairman of the Board of Tax Appeals upon its organization. He was one of the original twelve members appointed to the Board, and one of a group of five appointed "from the Bureau of Internal Revenue". In March 1927, Hamel was hired to head the simplification division of the Joint Committee on Internal Revenue Taxation, which he left in 1929 to establish a law firm that would eventually become part of Foley & Lardner.

Hamel died in McLean, Virginia, at the age of 88.

References

Members of the United States Board of Tax Appeals
United States Article I federal judges appointed by Calvin Coolidge
1880s births
1970 deaths
People from Walsh County, North Dakota